The Ice Runway  is the principal runway for the U.S. Antarctic Program during the summer Antarctic field season due to its proximity to McMurdo Station. The other two runways in the area are the snow runway at Williams Field (NZWD) and the compacted snow runway at Phoenix Airfield (NZFX), which replaced Pegasus Field (NZPG) in 2017.

The sea ice runway is capable of handling wheeled aircraft, which have included to date:  Lockheed C-5 Galaxy, Lockheed C-141 Starlifter, Boeing C-17 Globemaster III, Lockheed C-130 Hercules and Lockheed P-3 Orion.  In the summer season of 2009/2010 the RNZAF trialed a modified Boeing 757 operationally. The intention is to use the Boeing 757 for passenger transport, thereby freeing up capacity for C17 cargo space.

The annual sea-ice runway for wheeled aircraft is constructed at the start of each season and is used until early December when the sea ice begins to break up. Subsequently flight operations are moved back to Williams Field. Pilots landing C-17 Globemaster III cargo aircraft on the sea ice runway report that the surface is stable, not unlike landing on concrete. The similarity with land bases ends when the jet aircraft rolls to a stop, however. The nearly 450,000 pound (= 201 tons) weight of the plane, including cargo and passengers, causes it to sink into the ice, albeit only a matter of inches. A laser light is trained on the aircraft to measure the settlement rate. The $200 million aircraft is moved to a new location on the six-foot-thick ice as a safety measure if the 10-inch red line is reached, according to the News Tribune in Tacoma, Washington.

Accidents and incidents
On 31 October 1960, a United States Navy Lockheed EC-121 Warning Star from  Oceanographic Development Squadron Eight crashed while attempting to land on the Ice Runway. The pilot and co-pilot were badly injured, but the other crew received minor injuries or were uninjured. The aircraft was not recovered, and was simply allowed to sink when the ice melted in the spring.

See also
 List of airports in Antarctica
 McMurdo Sound

References

External links

 Ambling through Ice Town, Antarctic Sun. November 28, 1999.

Airports in the Ross Dependency
Airports in Antarctica